Lev Ivanovich Borisov  (Russian: Лев Иванович Борисов;  8 December 1933, Plyos – 15 November 2011, Moscow) was a Russian actor. Brother of Oleg Borisov. He was a People's Artist of Russia.

Lev Borisov was buried at the Troyekurovskoye Cemetery.

Selected filmography
 1954 —  Certificate of Maturity
 1954 — Problem Child
 1956 —  Different Fates
 1957 —  The Height   
 1959 —  Ballad of a Soldier  
 1959 —  Destiny of a Man 
 1976 —  Twelve Chairs
 1978 —  Again Aniskin
 1980 —  The White Raven
 1983 —  The Demidovs
 1983 —  The Мistress of the Оrphanage
 1987 —  Visit to Minotaur
 1988 —  Whose Are You, Old People?
 1989 — Entrance to the Labyrinth 
 1989 —  Vagrant Bus  
 1989 —  Abduction of the Wizard 
 1990 —  Cloud-Paradise  
 1995  —  Shirli-Myrli 
 1996 —  Barkhanov and his Вodyguard
 1996 —  Life Line
 2000/2003 —  Bandit Petersburg  
 2004 —  Pa
 2004 —  The Penal Battalion
 2007 — A Second Before...  
 2008 — Batyushka
 2012 — The Dragon Syndrome

References

External links

1933 births
2011 deaths
People from Privolzhsky District, Ivanovo Oblast
Soviet male actors
Russian male actors
Honored Artists of the Russian Federation
Burials in Troyekurovskoye Cemetery
People's Artists of Russia